Onesi Constituency is an electoral constituency in the Omusati Region of Namibia on the border to Angola. It had 12,935 inhabitants in 2004 and 9,941 registered voters . Its district capital is the settlement of Onesi.

Politics
Onesi constituency is traditionally a stronghold of the South West Africa People's Organization (SWAPO) party. In the 2015 local and regional elections SWAPO candidate Titus Kanyele won uncontested and became councillor after no opposition party nominated a candidate.  The SWAPO candidate won the 2020 regional election by a large margin. Festus Petrus obtained 4,223 votes, followed by Johannes Amunyela of the Independent Patriots for Change (IPC), an opposition party formed in August 2020, with 322 votes.

References

Constituencies of Omusati Region
States and territories established in 1992
1992 establishments in Namibia